A qupai (also called ) is the generic term for a fixed melody used in traditional Chinese music. The literal meaning is "named tune," "labeled melody," "titled tune," or "titled song". Qupai are relatively brief, most comprising between 20 and 70 measures in 2/4 meter. Many qupai are centuries old, but only a few of these have been handed down to the present. 

Qupai are commonly used in Chinese opera, such as kunqu and Beijing opera, as well as by folk and ritual ensembles, including Jiangnan sizhu and Taoist ritual music. Qupai have also been used as the basis for 20th century compositions for Chinese instruments, both solo and ensemble. In these contexts these stock melodies very often serve as a basis for melodic elaboration and variation. This variation is particularly well codified in the taoqu structure of Chaozhou xianshi music.

The Baisha xiyue tradition of the Naxi of Lijiang, Yunnan utilizes 24 qupai.

Notable qupai
Ba Ban (八板, Eight Beats)
Huang Ying Liang Chi (黄莺亮翅, Oriole Soaring)
Jiang Jun Ling (将军令, General's Command)
Liu Qingniang (柳青娘, Lady Green Willow)
Qiansheng Fo (千声佛, A Thousand Buddhas)
Shui Long Yin (水龙吟, Water Dragon Chant)
Wan Nian Huan (万年欢, Everlasting Joy)
Xi Jiang Yue (西江月, Moon Over the West River)
巫山顶
即 (五三点)
五梆子
巴音杭盖
推辘轴
十番
Si Gong Zhu (四公主, Four Princesses)

See also
Xiaodiao

References

External links
Xi Jiang Yue (西江月) Moon Over the West River in Chinese Calligraphy,Big Seal Script.
Harris, Rachel (2004). Singing the village: music, memory and ritual among the Sibe of Xinjiang. .
Witzleben, John Lawrence (1995). "Silk and bamboo" music in Shanghai: the jiangnan sizhu instrumental, p.70. .

Chinese music
Melody